Cladonia cenotea or the powdered cup lichen is a species of cup lichen in the family Cladoniaceae. It was first described by Erik Acharius in 1823.

It grows on the north side of rotting wood or stumps in shaded areas.

References

cenotea
Lichen species
Lichens described in 1989
Taxa named by Erik Acharius